Vanessa Bürki (born 1 April 1986) is a Swiss football striker who plays for BSC YB. She has also been a member of the Swiss national team.

Club career 
On 18 April 2016, she extended her contract with FC Bayern Munich until 2018. However, she transferred to BSC YB in 2017.

Clubs 
Bürki started playing football at FC Wacker Grenchen at the age of twelve and stayed until the C Youth level together with boys, before moving to DFC Zuchwil, a women's football club from Zuchwil in the canton of Solothurn, in 2001. For this club she played from 2002 to 2006 (from March 13, 2005 under the name FFC Zuchwil 05) in the National League A , was twice second in the championship, won the Torjägerkanone and was awarded Footballer of the Year. Becoming aware of this, FC Bayern Munich signed her. She made her debut on September 10, 2006 (Day 1) in a 4-1 home win over Hamburger SV and crowned it with their first Bundesliga goal, the goal for the final score in the 80th minute. From 18 April to 10 May 2009, on four consecutive matchdays, she scored two goals and on 31 October 2009 (7th matchday), and she even scored four goals in a 6-2 home win over 1. FC Saarbrücken. In 2015 and 2016 she won the German championship with the Munich team. At the end of the 2016/17 season, she said goodbye to FC Bayern Munich after eleven seasons. For the 2017/18 season they committed the Swiss division club BSC YB.

National Team 
On March 26, 2003, she made her debut in the U-19 national team, which lost 3-0 to Germany in Sursee.

She took part in the U-19 European Championship in Hungary from 20 to 31 July 2005, and was eliminated after three games in the preliminary round. She scored scored five out of eight of her team's goals.

She made her U-20 debut on June 5, 2006 in Oberdorf in a 2-1 defeat against Russia. She crowned her second appearance for this national team on June 8, 2006 in Herzogenbuchsee, in a 5-1 victory over Argentina with three goals.

From August 17 to September 3, 2006, she took part in the U-20 World Cup in Russia and played 90 minutes in all three group games. She scored both goals for Switzerland in the first group match on August 18, in the 4-2 defeat by Mexico.

On May 22, 2004, she made her debut in the senior national team, which scored a 0-0 draw in Trapani in the European Championship qualifier against the selection of Italy. She scored her first international goal on February 25, 2006 in Bellinzona in the 2-3 defeat against Denmark with the opening goal to make it 1-0 in the 20th minute.

Honours

Club
 Bayern München
 Bundesliga (2): 2014–15, 2015–16
 DFB-Pokal (1): 2011–12
 Bundesliga Cup (1): 2011
 2017: Cyprus Cup - Winner
 2004, 2006: Swiss Vice Champion
 2009, 2017: German Vice Champion
 2006: Swiss top scorer

Individual
She was named Best Swiss Footballer of 2006.

References

1986 births
Living people
Swiss women's footballers
Swiss expatriate sportspeople in Germany
Expatriate women's footballers in Germany
FC Bayern Munich (women) players
Switzerland women's international footballers
Frauen-Bundesliga players
Women's association football forwards
2015 FIFA Women's World Cup players
Swiss Women's Super League players
BSC YB Frauen players
Sportspeople from the canton of Solothurn
UEFA Women's Euro 2017 players
Swiss expatriate women's footballers
FFC Zuchwil 05 players

Expatriate footballers in Germany
Association football forwards
Swiss expatriate footballers